Lorna Jane is an athletic apparel retailer with headquarters in Brisbane, Australia and regional offices in the US, Singapore, China, and New Zealand.  It was founded in 1990 by Lorna Jane Clarkson and her husband Bill Clarkson. The women’s activewear brand has 134 stores across Australia, New Zealand, USA and Singapore. They also have licensee stores in New Caledonia, Mexico, Europe, Dubai and Malaysia.

Products 
Lorna Jane produces and sells a wide range of garments, including tights, sports bras, tops, shorts, pants, jackets and hoodies, shoes, and various accessories. Many items use the company's own moisture-wicking four-way stretch fabric, "LJ Excel". Others incorporate compression fabrics and "power mesh" panels. A Marie Claire article called Lorna Jane out as one of the 6 best sustainable sports brands on the market.

Limited Edition Ranges and Pieces 
The company releases limited edition ranges and pieces such as maternity ranges and 'Little Miss' for babies and young children.

Love Bead 
Every Lorna Jane garment has a small heart-shaped bead sewn into it somewhere; a message to consumers that the garment is made "with love". Garment styles are named after Lorna Jane team members, with one team member saying "Seeing your name pop up on a monthly style sheet is as exciting as waking up on Christmas morning!"

Sizing 

Garments were originally produced in sizes up to "L", and in 2014, Lorna Jane introduced an "XXS" and "XL" size. Beyond that, Clarkson has said she had no plans to produce "plus size" garments, saying that there was no demand from her customer base and that the brand's previous ventures in this direction had been unsuccessful; "If my customer wants bigger sizes, I will absolutely accommodate. But we have tried it and not sold it."

In 2015, Australian consumer organisation Choice evaluated a pair of Lorna Jane tights alongside equivalent garments from six competitors at a range of price points. The evaluation found that the Lorna Jane tights did not fare as well in some tests as some of their much cheaper competitors, although a textiles expert praised them for their construction and they did score better in stretch, stain and stitching tests.

Awards 
Lorna Jane has won a total of 13 design awards, numerous marketing awards and in 2017 was named the Marie Claire Readers Choice for Best Athleisure Brand.

Production 
Lorna Jane's website reiterates the brand's commitment to sustainable practices including production and sourcing. They have one principal source of production that they have been working with for more than 25 years.

The company prides itself for providing superior conditions for its factory workers, and claims that as few as three workers fail to return from Chinese New Year each year, when the norm for factories in the region is "hundreds". Workers refer to the factories as "Lorna Land". Lorna Jane production is WRAP Gold Certified but because they did not respond to their survey, the 2016 Ethical Fashion Guide produced by Baptist World Aid Australia rated Lorna Jane as "D" grade for not completing the survey. Executive marketing and e-commerce manager Jessie Dean told Australian broadcaster the ABC that "It is important to us that our manufacturing source reflects who we are as a brand and our active living philosophy. We continually work to ensure that our workplace code of conduct protects the welfare of every employee and their environment." Clarkson says she would prefer to be still manufacturing in Australia, but the closure of Australian fabric mills and a lack of government support for the clothing industry made that impossible to sustain.

Men's wear 
Despite being asked "two or three times a week", Clarkson said she has no plans to expand into activewear for men. In another interview, she expressed her personal preference as "I like men to wear their old footy shirts and triathlon shorts."

History

Foundation 

Founder Lorna Jane Clarkson (née Smith) was a dental technician and part-time aerobics instructor who was dissatisfied with the workout clothes available to women in the late 1980s and started making her own. Her designs proved popular with her students, who asked her to start making clothes for them too. In 1988, she decided to start making clothes as her full-time occupation. When she and her partner, Bill Clarkson, experienced difficulty finding stores interested in carrying the range, they decided to retail it themselves In 1990, they opened their first store, in an upper floor of Brisbane's Broadway on the Mall shopping centre.

By 2000, the business required a larger factory, and to fund this expansion, the Clarksons sold their home and bought a building in Fortitude Valley for $465,000. They refurbished it and within two years, the value of the property had appreciated to $4 million, which the Clarksons were able to use as collateral for further growth.

The company logo is three rhombuses, each with two of its opposing corners curved. The shape represents a stylised "L" and "J" joined together.

Expansion and diversification 
The company was able to use the Global Financial Crisis of 2008 to its advantage. Rather than waiting for economic conditions to improve, Lorna Jane continued its expansion by taking opportunities for leases in favourable locations that would have been unavailable to the company in a stronger climate. This strategy led to the company's biggest growth period.

In 2010, private equity firm CHAMP Ventures purchased a 40% stake of the company.

In response to the 2010–11 Queensland floods, Lorna Jane initiated a charity programme where the company would allow customers to exchange used activewear (of any brand) for a store credit. The used clothing collected would then be donated to the Salvation Army. Originally intended to run for a week in mid 2011, the "Swap Shop" became a permanent fixture and was still running in 2017. In that time, customers had brought in over 45,000 garments for the business to pass on to charity.

Following a year-long consultancy with the Wharton Business School and the University of Queensland into strategies for entering the US market, March 2012 saw the opening of the first US store in Malibu. At a time when ecommerce was replacing traditional bricks-and-mortar retailing, Lorna Jane adopted the unconventional approach of investing more in physical stores. By mid-2013, a new Lorna Jane store was opening in California every three weeks. The Clarksons chose California as the brand's initial entry point to the US because they found the active and outdoor way of life there to be similar to Australia.

In August 2012, Lorna Jane launched a fitness tracking app.

By 2013, the company took a 9.4% share of the entire athletic clothing industry in Australia. Consolidated revenue for 2012-13 was set to exceed $110 million. Annualised growth was sustained above 40% for the five years between 2008 and 2013. In the same year, the company introduced the "Active Living Rooms", with the first one opening at the Gasworks development in Teneriffe, Queensland, and also launched a fashion-forward range named "Uniquely" that further blurred the line between activewear and casualwear.

2014
In early 2014, the Clarksons and CHAMP considered the possibility of an initial public offering, with bankers pitching exit strategies for the private equity firm. The float was reportedly aimed at returning $400 million to the business owners. Analyst Brian Walker suggested that the motivation for the float might have been a specific timeframe within which CHAMP had to return funds to investors, or that CHAMP had predicted a peak in Lorna Jane's rate of growth and were opting to exit at this point. When reports of a float started appearing in the financial press in February, neither the Clarksons nor CHAMP would comment. However, on 19 March, CEO Bill Clarkson confirmed for the Financial Review that an IPO had been considered and rejected. In May, the Financial Review reported that CHAMP's board scrapped the idea of an IPO after receiving at least five expressions of interest from large US businesses in the fitness industry and appointed Credit Suisse to negotiate a sale instead. Over the next four months, they received interest from over forty prospective investors, including Under Armour and Foot Locker. European private equity firm Permira emerged as the leading contender by mid-September. Ultimately, however, the Clarksons withdrew from a sale when they considered the implications of losing their personal control of the brand. They opted to retain a controlling interest, and CHAMP agreed to maintain its level of investment.

In March 2014, the company partnered with department store chains in Australia and the US to start carrying the brand. In Australia, the partnership was with David Jones, and included the "Uniquely" line in in-store concessions. In the US, the partnership was with Nordstrom, and additionally included representation in one Nordstrom store in Canada and another in Puerto Rico.

In July 2014, a change.org petition started by Megan Sauer asked Lorna Jane to add larger sizes to its range. The petition attracted 2,705 signatures, and resulted in the brand adding a new size, XL. This size falls between Australian women's clothing sizes 14 and 16, when the average Australian woman is size 16.

In August 2014, the company ventured into publishing, with a six-weekly magazine titled Active Living available through its stores. The initial print run was 75,000 copies.

In August 2014, Lorna Jane began registering its designs for garments and accessories with Intellectual Property Australia as a pre-emptive step to help protect them against copyright infringement.

Controversies

Controversy over job advertisement

In July 2015, the company experienced a backlash over an advertisement for a job vacancy on Seek for a "receptionist/fit model" that specified body dimensions to meet the model requirements to fit a sample size. Critics accused the company of including this element to provide a basis on which to hire a receptionist of a particular body type. Lorna Jane defended the ad and insisted that the fit model requirements were a genuine vacancy within the business that was being combined with the receptionist position out of a desire for efficiency, since both positions were only required on a part-time basis. The ad was taken down after two days, which Lorna Jane claimed was due to the company having received a sufficient number of applicants for the position. Clarkson later said that, in hindsight, she wished the ad had been worded differently, and speculated that the word "fit" had been misconstrued by critics to mean "physically fit" rather than a model to test-fit clothes.

The successful candidate worked as a Receptionist as well as carrying out duties during fittings and sample testing, before being promoted into another role within the company.

Allegations by ex-store manager Amy Robinson found to be false

In September 2015, Amy Robinson, a former manager of the Lorna Jane outlet store at the DFO Brisbane centre, commenced legal action against the company, complaining that she was bullied regularly when she worked there for six months in 2012. She sought over $500,000 in damages. The company denied the allegations.

The case went to trial in the Brisbane District Court on 14 February 2017. Rebecca Treston QC, representing Lorna Jane pointed out that in a twelve-page letter to management in 2012, outlining various grievances, Robinson had not once mentioned being bullied over her weight.

The trial resumed to hear the remainder of the medical evidence and adjourned pending Judge Gregory Koppenol decision. The decision was handed down November 2017 in Lorna Jane's favour. The decision stated that Amy Robinson had failed to prove any of her claims and the company had acted fairly and reasonably in its responses. Judge Gregory Koppenol also stated that he found her to be an, "unreliable witness with serious credibility issues". Judge Koppenol said he thought Ms Robinson's evidence about her physical injuries was "false" and "extremely unlikely to be true", and in some respects not even supported by medical evidence.

Impersonator asks women for revealing photos

On 16 October 2015, a 32-year-old Gold Coast psychologist (kept anonymous in press reports) said that she had received unsolicited contact from a man who claimed to be representing Lorna Jane, offering her work as a model. The man, who identified himself as "Victor" first made contact via telephone, and arranged a Skype interview with her. "Victor" asked that she send him photos of herself in Lorna Jane sports bras and shorts, which she did, later recalling, "I was so excited about the possibility of being in a Lorna Jane catalogue as I adore the brand and what it stands for so sent the photos through." "Victor" claimed that Lorna Jane was interested in her story because of how she maintained an active lifestyle while living with rheumatoid arthritis. In a subsequent phone call, "Victor" told her that she would have to lose another 5-6 kilograms, would have to hide the bandages and gloves she wears to support her arthritic wrists, and would require Botox injections to hide her wrinkles before she could model for Lorna Jane. After direct contact between the woman and Lorna Jane, the company revealed that other women had been approached by the same man, including two yoga instructors in Hobart, and that they were working with Queensland Police's Cyber Crime Unit. Lorna Jane expressed disappointment that initial media accounts had not reported on the fraudulent nature of "Victor's" requests. The victim said she was "embarrassed" to have been scammed, and felt sorry for Lorna Jane that the media would have reported that a Lorna Jane representative would have said "such awful things."

Exploitation claim by ex-employee Vanessa Croll

In November 2015, ex-employee Vanessa Croll complained in Newscorp opinion site RendezView that she had been "used" by the company. While employed as a personal trainer by the business over ten years previously, Clarkson asked her whether she would be willing to model clothes for the catalogue. Croll agreed, but after completing the photo shoot, was only offered a small payment and clothing, which she felt was inadequate. Nevertheless, she continued to work as a trainer for Lorna Jane and accepted occasional modelling work. Croll accepted one final modelling offer for $150 and then sought other employment. A Lorna Jane representative responded to the complaint via a Facebook post, explaining that Clarkson had offered Croll the modelling opportunities to support her ambitions to be a model, and that the small payments reflected the small business that Lorna Jane was at the time. The post also claims that Croll did not mention any of these concerns at the time, and branded her "an opportunist trying to benefit from Lorna’s success". Other media responses criticised the tone of Lorna Jane's response on Facebook or highlighted the pitfalls of accepting offers of payment for creative work in terms of "exposure".

Criticism by Universal Society of Hinduism over yoga fee

In December 2015, the president of the Universal Society of Hinduism, Rajan Zed, issued a press release criticising Lorna Jane and Sydney Airport for charging fees for yoga classes that passengers could take at the Lorna Jane Active Living room there. In the statement, Zed said, "charging fee for it [yoga] at a public facility like Sydney Airport did not seem right." Sydney Airport responded that the space was operated by Lorna Jane as a retail business and is not a public space but that it was free for passengers to use outside of class times. Lorna Jane responded that the company was supportive of anything that encouraged passengers to look after their health and have the space available for passengers to use.

Patent Infringement 
In March 2019, Carolyn Taylor, a Bendigo based physiotherapist claims the activewear company's leggings infringe her patent that was filed in 2010 and licensed to manufacturers.

Mr Clarkson said Lorna Jane had been designing and manufacturing compressive and supportive Activewear since 1989 when Ms Clarkson started hand-making leotards and short tights for herself and for clients in her aerobics classes.
"Compression and support tights have been part of our business for the last 30 years, over 20 years before this patent was lodged," Mr Clarkson said.

In January 2020, these proceedings were dismissed by order of the Federal Court, with the consent of both parties.
The Applicants’ claim against Lorna Jane for patent infringement (which Lorna Jane has always denied) has been dismissed. Lorna Jane's cross-claim that the Applicants’ patent is invalid has also been dismissed. No costs have been ordered as part of the dismissal. Lorna Jane is pleased to continue offering its full range of active core stability and other products to all its customers.

Lorna Jane South Africa

In July 2019, Thomas Stringfellow, who was the managing director of Lorna Jane South Africa was arrested on fraud charges related to loan agreements to fund Lorna Jane. Investors have allegedly lost in excess of R100m (AUD10m). The stores have closed and online accounts and the website are no longer active.

Misleading marketing used to exploit COVID-19 fears 
In July 2020, Lorna Jane was fined AUD $40,000 by the Therapeutic Goods Administration (TGA), over a range of activewear that the company promoted as protecting wearers against the Corona Virus. The clothing was made using "LJ Shield exclusive technology," which the brand promoted the range with slogans such as "Cure for the Spread of COVID-19? Lorna Jane Thinks So." and claimed "With Lorna Jane Shield on our garments it meant that we were completely eliminating the possibility of spreading any deadly viruses" 

This marketing move was criticised by health organisations, including the Royal Australian College of General Practitioners. RACGP president, Dr Harry Nespolon, criticised Lorna Jane for allegedly exploiting fears regarding the COVID-19 pandemic, stating that "active wear is great for the gym but it can’t protect you against viruses or bacteria". 

In December 2020, the Australian Competition and Consumer Commission (ACCC) instituted proceedings against the company in the Australian federal court over the false and misleading claims. ACCC commissioner, Sarah Court stated that the claims made by Lorna Jane "gave the impression that the COVID-19 claims were based on scientific or technological evidence when this was not the case. We are particularly concerned about this because consumers often trust well-known brands and assume that their marketing claims are backed up by solid evidence." The ACCC alleged that Lorna Jane had done no testing to back up the claims and that company founder Lorna Jane Clarkson was knowingly involved in the alleged conduct via claims she made in a media release and Instagram video promoting the range.

In July 2021, the company was fined $5 million, with the court holding that Lorna Jane sought to exploit that fear and concern of the public through the use of misleading, deceptive and untrue representations about the properties of LJ Shield activewear.

References

Clothing brands of Australia
Australian companies established in 1990
Clothing retailers of Australia
Companies based in Brisbane
Sportswear brands
Companies that filed for Chapter 11 bankruptcy in 2021